Dongan may refer to:

People
Donegan, an Irish surname, sometimes spelled Dongan
Dongan Baronets, in the Baronetage of Ireland
Dungan people, a Muslim population of Chinese origin living in central Asia

Places

Yunfu City, Guangdong, China. From 1578 to 1913, known as Dong'an (formerly romanized as Tong On)
Dong'an County, Yongzhou, Hunan, China
Dong'an District, Mudanjiang, Heilongjiang, China
Dong'an, Chongqing, town in Chengkou County, Chongqing, China
Dong'an, Zhucheng, in Zhucheng Subdistrict, Xinzhou District, Wuhan, Hubei, China
Dongan, Iran, a village in North Khroasan Province, Iran
Dongan Hills, Staten Island, U.S.
Dongan Hills station
Dongan-gu, Anyang, South Korea
Dong'an Road station, a station on the Shanghai Metro, China

Other uses
Dong'an chicken, a Chinese cuisine cold parboiled chicken dish 
Dongan Engine Manufacturing Company, a Chinese engine manufacturer

See also

Dungan (disambiguation)